Khuree Khovguud FC is a Mongolian association football club that last competed in the First League.

Domestic history
Key

References

External links
Official Facebook
MFF profile
Eleven Sports channel

Football clubs in Mongolia